The  Elsworth  is a Chesapeake Bay skipjack, built in 1901 at Hudson, Maryland. She is a  two-sail bateau, or "V"-bottomed deadrise type of centerboard sloop. She has a beam of 14.3', a depth of 3.1', and a gross registered tonnage of 8 tons.  She is one of the 35 surviving traditional Chesapeake Bay skipjacks and a member of the last commercial sailing fleet in the United States.

She is owned by the Echo Hill Outdoor School and used for educational excursions on the Chester River and Chesapeake Bay. The Echo Hill School acquired the Elsworth in 1988 and rebuilt her starting in 1996. The Elsworth is kept at the public pier in Chestertown, Maryland alongside the Schooner Sultana.

She was listed on the National Register of Historic Places in 1985. She is assigned Maryland dredge number 22.

References

External links
ELSWORTH (skipjack), Talbot County, including photo in 1999, at Maryland Historical Trust

Kent County, Maryland
Skipjacks
Ships on the National Register of Historic Places in Maryland
1901 ships
National Register of Historic Places in Kent County, Maryland